Moria Khan Goth is a neighbourhood in the Korangi District in eastern Karachi, Pakistan. It was previously part of Shah Faisal Town, which was an administrative unit that was disbanded in 2011.

There are several ethnic groups in Moria Khan Goth including Muhajirs, Sindhis, Kashmiris, Seraikis, Pakhtuns, Balochis, Memons, Bohras and Ismailis.

References

External links 
 Karachi Website

Neighbourhoods of Karachi
Shah Faisal Town